Chionodes tundra is a moth in the family Gelechiidae. It is found in the Russian Far East, where it has been recorded from north-eastern Yakutia and Wrangel Island.

References

Chionodes
Moths described in 2012
Moths of Asia